Godplayer is a novel by Robin Cook. It was first released in 1983 in the UK and United States. It has 285 pages. Like most of Cook's other work, it is a medical thriller. Working with her husband, a respected cardiac surgeon, at Boston Memorial is a dream come true for Dr. Cassandra Kingsley—until a series of mysterious deaths rocks the hospital and Cassandra's most frightening suspicions are realized. Amidst a hospital power struggle that pits resident doctors against private practitioners, eighteen cardiac surgery patients mysteriously die. Doctors Cassandra Kingsley and Robert Seibert investigate the deaths, making disturbing discoveries, such as a drug-taking, knife-happy surgeon and lethal IVs.

References

1983 American novels
American thriller novels
Novels by Robin Cook
Medical novels
G. P. Putnam's Sons books